Marta Filizola is a computational biophysicist who studies membrane proteins. Filizola's research concerns drug discovery the application of methods of computational chemistry and theoretical chemistry to biochemical and biomedical problems.

Filizola is the dean of the graduate school of biomedical sciences at the Icahn School of Medicine at Mount Sinai in New York City. Where she is a professor of pharmacological sciences and neuroscience, and also the Sharon and Frederick A. Klingenstein-Nathan G. Kase, MD Professor.

She is best known for her work aimed at providing mechanistic insight into the structure, dynamics, and function of G protein-coupled receptors using methods such as molecular modeling, bioinformatics, cheminformatics, enhanced molecular dynamics simulations, and rational drug design approaches. The Filizola laboratory's research has steadily been funded by the National Institutes of Health (NIH) since 2005.

As of 2016, Filizola is active in five research projects funded by the National Institute on Drug Abuse (NIDA), the National Institute of Mental Health (NIMH), and the National Heart, Lung, and Blood Institute (NHLBI).

Education
A native of Italy, Filizola received her bachelor's and master's degrees in chemistry from the University Federico II in Naples (class of 1993), and earned her PhD in computational chemistry from the Second University of Naples in 1999, though conducting most of her doctoral studies at the Department of Chemical Engineering of the Polytechnic University of Catalonia in Barcelona, Spain. She went on to pursue a postdoctorate in computational biophysics from the Molecular Research Institute in California, moving to New York City in 2001.

Career
Filizola joined the Department of Physiology & Biophysics at Mount Sinai School of Medicine (MSSM) as an instructor in 2002. She continued in this role at Weill Medical College (WMC) of Cornell University, also in New York City, until she was promoted assistant professor in 2005. She returned to Mount Sinai as an assistant professor in the Department of Structural and Chemical Biology, where she was later promoted associate professor (with tenure since January 2013), and then full professor in 2014.
Following three years as co-director of the Structural/Chemical Biology and Molecular Design (SMD) Graduate Program, and one year as co-director of the Biophysics and Systems Pharmacology (BSP) Graduate Program, she was appointed dean of the graduate school of biomedical sciences at Mount Sinai in May 2016. Dr. Filizola has also served as grant reviewer for NIH and other agencies for over 10 years. Currently, she is a regular study section member of the Biophysics of Neural Systems (BPNS) study section of NIH.

Awards and honors
Filizola's awards and honors include the title of European doctor in biotechnology from the European Association for Higher Education in Biotechnology in Genova, Italy (1999), a National Research Service Award from NIDA (2002), The Doctor Harold and Golden Lamport Award for Excellence in Basic Research from Mount Sinai School of Medicine (2008), and an Independent Scientist Award from NIDA (2009–present). She is also a member of the Faculty of 1000 for Pharmacology and Drug Discovery since 2013.

Research
Filizola's research program is mainly focused on G Protein-Coupled Receptors (GPCRs), which are the targets for about half of all currently used drugs. Special effort in her lab has been devoted to the subfamily of opioid receptors to discover/design novel painkillers with reduced abuse liability and other adverse effects. A second important line of investigation in the Filizola lab is on beta3 integrins towards the discovery of novel therapeutics to treat renal, hematologic, neoplastic, bone, and/or fibrotic diseases.

To obtain rigorous mechanistic insight into the structure, dynamics, and function of GPCRs and beta3 integrins, the Filizola lab uses several computational structural biology tools, ranging from molecular modeling, bioinformatics, cheminformatics, molecular dynamics simulations, a variety of enhanced sampling algorithms, and rational drug design approaches. Much of the work is done in close collaboration with major experimental labs with whom we have established longstanding synergistic ties.

Dr. Filizola is the author of over 100 original papers and chapters in the areas of computational chemistry/biophysics and drug discovery, as well as the editor of 2 books: "G Protein-Coupled Receptors - Modeling and Simulation" and "G Protein-Coupled Receptors in Drug Discovery". She is also an inventor, with a number of patents to her credit.

Publications (partial list)

References

External links
 Filizola Laboratory

Living people
Place of birth missing (living people)
Year of birth missing (living people)
Women biophysicists
Italian women biologists
Icahn School of Medicine at Mount Sinai faculty
University of Naples Federico II alumni
Polytechnic University of Catalonia alumni
Italian women academics
Computational chemists
American women academics
21st-century American women